Rock What You Got is the fifth album from the band Superchick.  It was released on June 24, 2008. The album debuted at No. 65 on the Billboard 200 album chart, selling nearly 10,000 copies its first week. The band has described the album as more progressive, in-your-face sound and has dubbed it "rock-o-tronic". In May 2008, Inpop released three radio singles from the album. "Hold" was played on Christian contemporary hit radio stations, "Crawl" went to adult contemporary stations, and "Hey, Hey" to Christian rock stations. In late May, Inpop Records released a free download of the track "Alive" for further promotion of the album.
The album also features an all-instrumental song ("Guitar Hero") and a remix of their biggest hit "Stand in the Rain".

The album was nominated for a Grammy Award in the "Best Rock/Rap Gospel Album" category, but lost out to tobyMac's album.

A music video was made for the song "Cross the Line".

"Rock What You Got" was featured in the 2012 American Girl movie An American Girl: McKenna Shoots for the Stars.

Track listing
All song composed by Brandon Estelle, David Ghazarian, Matt Dally, Myron Hsu, Melissa Brock & Patricia Brock.

References

2008 albums
Superchick albums
Inpop Records albums